Paralithodes platypus, the blue king crab, is a species of North Pacific king crab which lives near St. Matthew Island, the Pribilof Islands, and the Diomede Islands, Alaska, with further populations along the coasts of Japan and Russia. Although blue king crabs are among the largest crabs in the world and reputedly may exceed  in weight, they are generally smaller than red king crabs.

Fisheries 
The St. Matthew fishery peaked in 1983 with  but experienced a similar decline and was closed in 1999. It was opened in 2009, and was featured on the television show Deadliest Catch. The St. Matthew stock is rebuilding but the fishery remains closed, while the Pribilof stock has not drastically improved. Diomede blue king crabs have never been harvested commercially, but support a subsistence fishery for the Native Village of Diomede, Alaska, population 170.

Colder water slows the rate of crab growth and crabs at northern latitudes are often smaller than more southern crabs. Diomede blue king crabs are similar in size to St. Matthew Island crabs.

Distribution

Blue king crabs can be found in the Bering Sea in relatively small abundances compared to red king crabs. The main populations near Alaska are found near the Diomede Islands, Point Hope, St. Matthew Island, and the Pribilof Islands. Additionally, populations exist in the Norton Sound all the way to St. Lawrence Island. There are smaller populations located off the eastern coast of Asia, near northern Japan and Siberia. Blue king crabs have a more northerly distribution compared to red king crabs, which is due to the colder waters of the northern Bering Sea being suitable for blue king crabs to survive. The unique population locations of the blue king crab are a result from glacial interactions with the water temperature of the Bering Sea. A period of increased temperature limited the spread of cold-water species, pushing the species further northward into the depths of the Bering Sea. Not only did blue king crabs retreat to the northern stretches of the Bering Sea, but they also had a possible population shrinkage due to glacial epochs.

Migration

Reproduction
Pribilof Island blue king crabs mate and produce eggs in late March to early May. Females generally brood their eggs externally for 12–14 months. Since blue king crabs need more than a year to brood their eggs, they miss a breeding cycle just before the larvae hatch and only produce eggs every other year, although first-time breeders can often produce eggs in subsequent years. Females release larvae around the middle of April in the Pribilof Islands, while those held at warmer temperatures in the laboratory may release larvae as early as February.

Female blue king crabs in the Pribilof Islands grow to the largest size before they are reproductively mature. About 50% of crabs are mature at  CL. St. Matthew Island females can become sexually mature at  CL and Diomede crabs are similar. Larger female crabs from the Pribilof Islands have the highest fecundity, producing 162,360 eggs or 110,033 larvae per crab. The reduction in fecundity is about 33% between the egg and larval stages. In Japan, an average of 120,000 larvae were released from each blue king crab. Diomede blue king crabs release an average of 60,000 larvae per female.

Environmental variables, such as tides, temperature, salinity, light, phytoplankton blooms, and predation, are seasonally pulsed and likely serve as cues for larval release. Release of larvae over a longer period may serve to give the female a larger window for larvae to correspond with any favorable environmental conditions that may exist, also known as “bet-hedging”. In the laboratory, Pribilof larvae hatch over the course of about one month, and Diomede larvae hatch over the course of 2–3 weeks. These differences may be due to water temperature in the laboratory, which has a clear effect on embryonic and larval development, and is probably slightly different from hatch timing in a natural environment.

References

King crabs
Edible crustaceans
Commercial crustaceans
Crustaceans of the eastern Pacific Ocean
Crustaceans of North America
Crustaceans of the United States
Crustaceans described in 1851
Taxa named by Johann Friedrich von Brandt